The Talaud bush-hen (Amaurornis magnirostris) is a vulnerable waterbird in the rail and crake family.

It is a recently described species from Karakelang Island in the Talaud Islands, Indonesia. It occurs in forest, scrub, and overgrown plantations.

Description

Talaud bush-hen is a 30.5 cm long, large, very dark and robust bush-hen. Its large head and its upperparts are dark brown, and its underparts and flanks are very dark bluish grey. The large, thick bill is pale green, and the legs are yellow, becoming more olive at the rear.

The only confirmed call of this shy species is a series of loud, low-pitched croaking barks, but it is likely that it also makes the shrieks typical of bush-hens.

Status

The population is estimated at 2,350-9,560 individuals on Karakelang. It may also occur on neighbouring islands, but there is little forest on those, less than 20 km2 compared to 350 km2 on Karakelang.

There are two protected areas totalling 21,800 hectares, but there has been no management and these areas are threatened by agricultural encroachment, illegal logging, and fire. Trapping for food and introduced rats may also pose a threat.

References

 Birdlife International
Taylor and van Perlo, Rails SBN 90-74345-20-4

Amaurornis
Endemic birds of Sulawesi
Birds described in 1998
Taxa named by Frank R. Lambert